A tomahawk is a type of single-handed axe used by the many Indigenous peoples and nations of North America. It traditionally resembles a hatchet with a straight shaft. In pre-colonial times the head was made of stone, bone, or antler, and European settlers later introduced heads of iron and steel. The term came into the English language in the 17th century as an adaptation of the Powhatan (Virginian Algonquian) word.

Tomahawks were general-purpose tools used by Native Americans and later the European colonials with whom they traded, and often employed as a hand-to-hand weapon. The metal tomahawk heads were originally based on a Royal Navy boarding axe (a lightweight hand axe designed to cut through boarding nets when boarding hostile ships) and used as a trade-item with Native Americans for food and other provisions.

Etymology
The name comes from Powhatan , derived from the Proto-Algonquian root  'to cut off by tool'. Algonquian cognates include Lenape , Malecite-Passamaquoddy , and Abenaki , all of which mean 'axe'.

History

The Algonquian people created the tomahawk. Before Europeans came to the continent, Native Americans would use stones, sharpened by a process of knapping and pecking, attached to wooden handles, secured with strips of rawhide. The tomahawk quickly spread from the Algonquian culture to the tribes of the South and the Great Plains.

Native Americans created a tomahawk’s poll, the side opposite the blade, which consisted of a hammer, spike or pipe. These became known as pipe tomahawks, which consisted of a bowl on the poll and a hollowed out shaft. These were created by European and American artisans for trade and diplomatic gifts for the tribes.

Composition

The tomahawk's original designs were fitted with heads of bladed or rounded stone or deer antler.

The poll can feature a hammer, spike, or may simply be rounded off, and they usually do not have lugs. From the 1900's onward, these sometimes had a pipe-bowl carved into the poll, and a hole drilled down the center of the shaft for smoking tobacco through the metal head. Pipe tomahawks are artifacts unique to North America, created by Europeans as trade objects but often exchanged as diplomatic gifts. They were symbols of the choice Europeans and Native Americans faced whenever they met: one end was the pipe of peace, the other an axe of war.

In colonial French territory, a different tomahawk design, closer to the ancient European francisca, was in use by French settlers and local peoples. In the late 18th century, the British Army issued tomahawks to their colonial regulars during the American Revolutionary War as a weapon and tool.

Modern use
Tomahawks are useful in camping and bushcraft scenarios. They are mostly used as an alternative to a hatchet, as they are generally lighter and slimmer than hatchets. They often contain other tools in addition to the axe head, such as spikes or hammers.

Modern tomahawks were used by selected units of the US armed forces during the Vietnam War and are referred to as "Vietnam tomahawks". These modern tomahawks have gained popularity with their reemergence by American Tomahawk Company in the beginning of 2001 and a collaboration with custom knife-maker Ernest Emerson of Emerson Knives, Inc. A similar wood handle Vietnam tomahawk is produced today by Cold Steel.

Many of these modern tomahawks are made of drop forged, differentially heat treated, alloy steel. The differential heat treatment allows for the chopping portion and the spike to be harder than the middle section, allowing for a shock-resistant body with a durable temper.

Tomahawk throwing competitions

Tomahawk throwing is a popular sport among American and Canadian historical reenactment groups, and new martial arts such as Okichitaw have begun to revive tomahawk fighting techniques used during the colonial era. Tomahawks are a category within competitive knife throwing. Today's hand-forged tomahawks are being made by master craftsmen throughout the United States.

Today, there are many events that host tomahawk throwing competitions.

The tomahawk competitions have regulations concerning the type and style of tomahawk used for throwing. There are special throwing tomahawks made for these kinds of competitions. Requirements such as a minimum handle length and a maximum blade edge (usually ) are the most common tomahawk throwing competition rules.

Military application

Tomahawks were used by individual members of the US Army Stryker Brigade in Afghanistan, the 172nd Stryker Brigade Combat Team based at Grafenwöhr (Germany), the 3rd Brigade, 2nd Infantry Division out of Fort Lewis, a reconnaissance platoon in the 2d Squadron 183d Cavalry (116th Infantry Brigade Combat Team) (OIF 2007–2008) and numerous other soldiers. The tomahawk was issued a NATO stock number (4210-01-518-7244) and classified as a "Class 9 rescue kit" as a result of a program called the Rapid Fielding Initiative; it is also included within every Stryker vehicle as the "modular entry tool set". This design enjoyed something of a renaissance with US soldiers in Iraq and Afghanistan as a tool and in use in hand-to-hand combat.

Law enforcement
The tomahawk has gained some respect from members of various law enforcement tactical (i.e. "SWAT") teams. Some companies have seized upon this new popularity and are producing "tactical tomahawks".  These SWAT-oriented tools are designed to be both useful and relatively light. Some examples of "tactical tomahawks" include models wherein the shaft is designed as a prybar. There are models with line/rope cutting notches, cuts in the head allowing its use as a wrench, and models with broad, heavy heads to assist in breaching doors.

Modern tomahawk fighting
There are not many systems worldwide which teach fighting skills with the axe or a tomahawk to civilians. However one martial art known as Okichitaw teaches tomahawk fighting in conjunction with other indigenous weapons such as the plains dagger, lance, and gunstock war club, mostly based on Plains Indian combat principles. 

In the 20th and 21st century, tomahawks have been prominently featured in films and video games (e.g. Dances with Wolves; Last of the Mohicans; The Patriot; Jonah Hex; Abraham Lincoln: Vampire Hunter; Bullet to the Head; and Assassin's Creed III), leading to increased interest among the public. Tomahawks are among the weapons used in the Filipino martial art escrima.

Manufacturers
Modern tomahawk manufacturers include:
 American Tomahawk Company
 RMJ Tactical
 Benchmade Knife Company
 SOG Specialty Knives 
 Gerber Legendary Blades
 Cold Steel
 Winkler Knives
 Walk By Faith 777

See also
 Foam tomahawk
 Hurlbat
 Native American weaponry
 Shepherd's axe
 Tomahawk chop
 Mambele/Hunga Munga

References

Blade weapons
Axes
Ancient weapons
Throwing axes
American inventions
Canadian inventions
Military equipment of the United States
Indigenous weapons of the Americas
Western (genre) staples and terminology